Benjamin Lantz Parker (September 5, 1913 – June 11 or 12, 2003) was a  Democratic member of the Pennsylvania House of Representatives.

References

Democratic Party members of the Pennsylvania House of Representatives
2003 deaths
1913 births
20th-century American politicians